Florenceville Airport  is a private airfield located  southwest of Florenceville, New Brunswick, Canada alongside the Saint John River.

The airport is owned by McCain Foods to service the company's two jets (Dassault Falcon 2000LX and Bombardier Aerospace Learjet 45)

The airport is classified as an airport of entry by Nav Canada and is staffed by the Canada Border Services Agency (CBSA). CBSA officers at this airport can handle general aviation aircraft only, with no more than 15 passengers.

The runway is located between farm fields on both sides.

References

Registered aerodromes in New Brunswick
Buildings and structures in Carleton County, New Brunswick
Transport in Carleton County, New Brunswick